The following radio stations broadcast on FM frequency 92.8 MHz:

Bangladesh
 Radio Bhumi in Dhaka

Malaysia
 Hitz in Alor Setar, Kedah, Perlis, Penang and Kota Bharu, Kelantan
 Zayan in Johor Bahru, Johor and Singapore

New Zealand
 Radio Hauraki in Taupo

United Kingdom
 BBC Radio Cymru in Penmaen Rhos
 Unity Radio in Manchester

References

Lists of radio stations by frequency